Jessup is a passenger rail station on the MARC Camden Line between Washington, DC and Baltimore's Camden Station. It was built on 8 Old Jessup Road, east of the embankment of the Jessup Road bridge over the Camden Line, a former Baltimore and Ohio Railroad line.

Station layout
The station has two side platforms. The station is not compliant with the Americans with Disabilities Act of 1990, lacking raised platforms for level boarding.

References

External links
 Station from Waterloo Road from Google Maps Street View

Camden Line
Jessup, Maryland
MARC Train stations
Former Baltimore and Ohio Railroad stations